Loray is a commune in the Doubs department in the Bourgogne-Franche-Comté region in eastern France.

Geography
Its highest point is the Roche-Barchey at 1000 m.

Population

Its inhabitants are called Loraitins (or Cabas).

Nearby communes
The neighbouring communes are La Sommette, Flangebouche, Orchamps-Vennes, Plaimbois-Vennes, and Vennes.

See also
 Communes of the Doubs department

References

External links

 The Clochers of Franche-Comté
 Loray on the intercommunal Web site of the department 

Communes of Doubs